WHMO may refer to:

 WHMO (FM), a radio station (91.1 FM) licensed to serve Madison, Indiana, United States
 The White House Military Office
 White Mist Outdoors an English Camping and Outdoors Store in Leigh-on-Sea, Essex